IEEE Transactions on Electromagnetic Compatibility is a peer-reviewed scientific journal published bimonthly by the IEEE Electromagnetic Compatibility Society. It covers electromagnetic compatibility (EMC) and electromagnetic interference, as well as computational electromagnetics and signal integrity methods for EMC problems. Its current editor-in-chief is Tzong-Lin Wu, professor of electrical engineering at National Taiwan University.

The journal was founded in 1959 under the name IRE Transactions on Radio Frequency Interference by Institute of Radio Engineers. According to the Journal Citation Reports, the journal has a 2020 impact factor of 2.006.

References

External links
 

Electromagnetic Compatibility, IEEE Transactions on
Electromagnetism journals
English-language journals
Publications established in 1959
Bimonthly journals